Shivanasamudra Falls is a waterfall on the border of Malavalli taluk, Mandya district and Kollegala taluk, Chamarajanagara district of the state of Karnataka, India. It is situated along the river Kaveri, which forms here the boundary to the Chamarajanagara district and Mandya district. Bharachukki Falls in Kollegala taluk of Chamarajanagara district and Gaganachukki Falls in Malavalli taluk of Mandya district and is the location of the first hydro-electric power stations in Asia, which were set up in 1902. The project was designed by Diwan Sheshadri Iyer and Diwan Sir M. Visvesvaraya of the Kingdom of Mysuru.Gaganachukki has a height of 90 metre and Bharachukki has a height of 69 metre.

Waterfalls
The Shivanasamudra Falls is on the Kaveri River after the river has found its way through the rocks and ravines of the Deccan Plateau  and drops off to form waterfalls. The island town of Shivanasamudra divides the river into twin waterfalls. This creates the fourth largest island in the course of the river. A group of ancient temples is located here and there likely was a village.

This is a segmented waterfall. Segmented waterfalls occur where the water flow is broken into two or more channels before dropping over a cliff, resulting in multiple sides by side waterfalls.

It is a perennial waterfall. The time of best flow are the monsoon season of July to October.

A common misconception about these waterfalls is that the left segment is called Gaganachukki and the right segment is called Bharachukki. In reality the Bharachukki falls are a few kilometers to the south-west of the Gaganachukki falls. This is due to the Kaveri river itself splitting a few kilometers to the south into western and eastern branches. The western branch results in the twin waterfalls of Gaganachukki, whereas the eastern branch results in the Bharachukki falls. The Gaganachukki waterfalls are best viewed from the Shivanasamudra watch tower. Most of the pictures showing the twin waterfalls are taken from that location. There is another approach to the Gaganachukki falls from the Darga Hazrath Mardane Gaib (Imam Ali). Despite warnings being posted, people climb down the rocks and attempt to view the waterfalls from behind/top, resulting in many fatal accidents.

Temples
Sri Ranganathaswamy Temple located here is built in the Dravidian style of architecture. Sri Ranganathaswamy here is also referred to as "Madhya Ranga", who is highly revered by Sri Vaishnava devotees among others. Among all the three Rangas, the deity here is believed to represent the youth form of God and hence is also fondly referred to as 'Mohana Ranga' and 'Jaganmohana Ranga'. Madhya Ranga is an ancient temple housing a beautiful idol, yet being located remotely sees few visitors. The temple often remains closed to visitors as the local priest is not punctual, and the Karnataka government temple authority has done little to maintain and promote this place. The Shivanasamudra temple is one of the three temples of the God Ranganatha (Madhya Ranga) that are situated in the natural islands formed in the Kaveri river. They are:

Adi Ranga: the Sri Ranganathaswamy Temple at Srirangapatna, Srirangapatna taluk, Mandya district, Karnataka, India
Madhya Ranga: the Sri Ranganathaswamy Temple at Shivanasamudra, Kollegala taluk, Chamarajanagara district, Karnataka, India
Antya Ranga: the Sri Ranganathaswamy Temple at Srirangam, Srirangam taluk, Tiruchirappalli district, Tamil Nadu, India

There are three more temples on three other sides of the island.

The ancient Sri Someshwara Temple, is another famous temple here at Shivanasamudra. Adi guru Sri Shankaracharya is said to have visited this place and established a "Sri Chakra". It is unusually believed that the Someshwara Linga here has existed much before the Ranganantha idol and that the Saptarshis was performing pooja and worshipping this Linga.

Power-generation
India's first hydro-electric power station is located at the waterfall and is still functional. This station was commissioned by the Diwan of Mysore, Sir K. Seshadri Iyer. The power generated here was initially used in Kolar Gold Fields.

One can visit the power station by obtaining special permission through Karnataka Power Corporation. Travelling in British built winch lift is an experience.

Transportation 
There are several buses available from Bangalore KR Market and Malavalli to Milega. It is recommended to board off at Satya Gala Hand Post; the distance being .

Many three-wheelers are available between the falls and the hand post. Recently many eco-friendly resorts, like Chukkimane,  have emerged near to these waterfalls which offer a night stay for the travelers who would wish to spend another day at the falls.

There is a small restaurant run by Karnataka State Tourism Development Corporation at Gaganachukki Falls. Apart from this, tourists have to come to the highway where there are a few dhabas.

Gallery

See also
List of waterfalls by flow rate

Notes

External links 

 
 Sivasamudram Map
 Sivasamudram Travelogue
 Cauvery or Sivasamudram Falls
 Travel Guide Sivasamudram
Shivanasamudra Falls - One Day Trip Guide from Bangalore with detailed Itinerary

Waterfalls of Karnataka
Kaveri River
Islands of Karnataka
Geography of Mandya district
Tourist attractions in Mandya district